Scissors is a census-designated place (CDP) in Hidalgo County, Texas. The population was 3,186 at the 2010 United States Census. It is part of the McAllen–Edinburg–Mission Metropolitan Statistical Area.

Geography
Scissors is located at  (26.136871, -98.045308).

Demographics
As of the census of 2000, there were 2,805 people, 604 households, and 561 families residing in the CDP. The population density was 1,642.9 people per square mile (633.3/km2). There were 673 housing units at an average density of 394.2/sq mi (152.0/km2). The racial makeup of the CDP was 77.68% Caucasian, 0.04% African American, 0.21% Native American, 20.96% from other races, and 1.11% from two or more races. Hispanic or Latino of any race were 99.22% of the population.

There were 604 households, out of which 65.6% had children under the age of 18 living with them, 72.8% were married couples living together, 15.7% had a female householder with no husband present, and 7.1% were non-families. 6.1% of all households were made up of individuals, and 1.8% had someone living alone who was 65 years of age or older. The average household size was 4.64 and the average family size was 4.83.

In the CDP, the population was spread out, with 43.1% under the age of 18, 11.7% from 18 to 24, 27.2% from 25 to 44, 13.1% from 45 to 64, and 5.0% who were 65 years of age or older. The median age was 22 years. For every 100 females, there were 92.9 males. For every 100 females age 18 and over, there were 90.6 males.

The median income for a household in the CDP was $18,963, and the median income for a family was $19,229. Males had a median income of $15,172 versus $14,438 for females. The per capita income for the CDP was $4,914. About 47.0% of families and 51.6% of the population were below the poverty line, including 59.6% of those under age 18 and 52.3% of those age 65 or over.

Education
Scissors is served by the Donna Independent School District. Stainke Elementary School and Runn Elementary School serve sections of Scissors. All portions are zoned by Todd Middle School and Donna High School.

In addition, South Texas Independent School District operates magnet schools that serve the community.

References

Census-designated places in Hidalgo County, Texas
Census-designated places in Texas